Curling's ulcer is an acute gastric erosion resulting as a complication from severe burns when reduced plasma volume leads to ischemia and cell necrosis (sloughing) of the gastric mucosa.  The condition was first described in 1823 and named after Thomas Blizard Curling, who observed ten such patients in 1842.

These stress ulcers (actually shallow multiple erosions) were once a common complication of serious burns, presenting in over 10% of cases, and especially common in child burn victims.  They result in perforation and hemorrhage more often than other forms of intestinal ulceration and had correspondingly high mortality rates (at least 80%).

A similar condition involving elevated intracranial pressure is known as Cushing's ulcer.

Treatment
While emergency surgery was once the only treatment, combination therapies including enteral feeding with powerful antacids such as H2-receptor antagonists or, more recently, proton pump inhibitors such as omeprazole have made Curling's ulcer a rare complication.

See also
 Cushing ulcer

References

External links 

Duodenum disorders